The 1900 Wimbledon Championships took place on the outdoor grass courts at the All England Lawn Tennis and Croquet Club in Wimbledon, London, United Kingdom. The tournament ran from 25 June until 4 July. It was the 24th staging of the Wimbledon Championships, and the first Grand Slam tennis event of 1900.

This was the final Wimbledon tournament during the reign of Queen Victoria.

Champions

Men's singles

 Reginald Doherty defeated  Sydney Smith 6–8, 6–3, 6–1, 5–7, 11–9

Women's singles

 Blanche Hillyard defeated  Charlotte Cooper 4–6, 6–4, 6–4

Men's doubles

 Laurence Doherty /  Reginald Doherty defeated  Herbert Roper Barrett /  Harold Nisbet 9–7, 7–5, 4–6, 3–6, 6–3

References

External links
 Official Wimbledon Championships website

 
Wimbledon Championships
Wimbledon Championships
Wimbledon Championships
Wimbledon Championships
1900 in English tennis